Wearing a thin scarlet or a crimson string (Hebrew: חוט השני, khutt hashani) as a type of talisman is a Jewish folk custom which is practiced as a way to ward off misfortune which is brought about by the "evil eye"  (Hebrew: עין הרע). The tradition is popularly thought to be associated with Kabbalah and religious forms of Judaism.

The red string itself is usually made from thin scarlet wool thread. It is worn as a bracelet or band on the left wrist of the wearer (understood in some Kabbalistic theory as the receiving side of the spiritual body), knotted seven times. The person has to knot it seven times while saying the kabbalah bracelet prayer.

In relation to traditional beliefs
Red strings around the wrist are common in many folk beliefs; for example the kalava is a Hindu version. There is no written mention in the Torah, Halacha, or Kabbala about tying a red string around the wrist. It seems to be a custom that has been around since at least the early 1900s.

Biblical history

A scarlet thread, tied about the wrist, is mentioned in Genesis 38. Tamar becomes pregnant by her father-in-law, Judah, and gives birth to twin boys. The following verses about this event are taken from the King James Bible:

Modern trend

Today in Israel, it is common to see elderly women peddling scarlet thread for pilgrims and tourists, especially in the Old City of Jerusalem. Outside of Israel in the late 1990s the red string became popular with many celebrities, including many non-Jews including Madonna and her children, Leonardo DiCaprio, and Michael Jackson, and later by Ariana Grande. The wider popularity is often linked to Philip Berg's  Kabbalah Centre. It also gained a surge in sales for Madonna according to editors of  Changing Fashion: A Critical Introduction to Trend Analysis and Cultural Meaning (2007).

See also 
 Apotropaic magic
 Hamsa
 Practical Kabbalah
 Raksha Bandhan
 Tefillin
 Tzitzit
 Martenitsa

References

Book sources

External links

Explanatory
 Beliefnet: Why the Red String?
 Teman, Elly. 2008. "The Red String: A Cultural History of a Jewish Folk Symbol," in: Bronner, Simon J. (ed.), Jewishness: Expression, Identity, Representation, Inaugural volume in book series on Jewish Cultural Studies, Oxford: Littman Library of Jewish Civilization.
 Ask the Rabbi: Red Strings

Critical
Rick Ross: "Found a religion...can't wait to put on my red string" 
Michael Laitman: Practical Kabbalah has no use for red strings

Amulets
Bracelets
Kabbalah